The 1949 European Figure Skating Championships were held in Milan, Italy from January 28 to 30. Elite senior-level figure skaters from European ISU member nations competed for the title of European Champion in the disciplines of men's singles, ladies' singles, and pair skating.

Austrian skater Eva Pawlik who had also been the best European lady skater at the 1948 European Championship won the title only in 1949, because North Americans had been admitted in 1948. So under modern rules Pawlik would have been a two-time European Champion.

Results

Men

Ladies

Pairs

References

External links
 results

European Championships
1949 in Italian sport
1949
European Championships,1949
Sports competitions in Milan
1949,European Figure Skating Championships
European Figure Skating Championships